The 2017–18 Western Michigan Broncos women's basketball team represents Western Michigan University during the 2017–18 NCAA Division I women's basketball season. The Broncos, led by sixth year head coach Shane Clipfell, play their home games at University Arena as members of the West Division of the Mid-American Conference. They finished the season 18–15, 9–9 in MAC play to finish in third place of the West division. They advanced to the semifinals of the MAC women's tournament where they lost to Buffalo.

Roster

Schedule
Source:

|-
!colspan=9 style=| Exhibition

|-
!colspan=9 style=| Non-conference regular season

|-
!colspan=9 style=| MAC regular season

|-
!colspan=9 style=| MAC Women's Tournament

See also
 2017–18 Western Michigan Broncos men's basketball team

References

Western Michigan
Western Michigan Broncos women's basketball seasons
Western Michigan
Western Michigan